Charles Dana Dexter (June 15, 1876 – June 9, 1934) was a Major League Baseball outfielder from 1896 to 1903.

Professional career
Dexter's career in baseball started in 1889, with the Evansville Cooks, a semiprofessional ball club. He played with them until 1894 when he decided to attend University of the South. He also played for the Louisville Colonels, Boston Braves, and Chicago Cubs organizations.

Iroquois Theatre fire
On December 30, 1903 Charlie Dexter and fellow player John Franklin Houseman were in a box watching a show at the Iroquois Theatre in Chicago when the Iroquois Theatre fire broke out; they were credited with breaking down a locked door and rescuing a number of people.

The stabbing of Quait Bateman
In 1905, he reportedly stabbed Milwaukee Brewers first baseman Quait Bateman in the chest while he was drunk. Dexter was taken to jail. Bateman decided to not press charges as he believed it was an accident and Dexter was released the next morning.

Personal life
In 1934, Dexter shot himself to death in Cedar Rapids, Iowa.

See also
 List of Major League Baseball career stolen bases leaders

External links 

 Charlie Dexter at Iroquois Theater

References

1876 births
1934 suicides
Major League Baseball outfielders
Major League Baseball catchers
Baseball players from Indiana
Louisville Colonels players
Chicago Orphans players
Boston Beaneaters players
19th-century baseball players
Sewanee Tigers baseball players
Suicides by firearm in Iowa
Louisville Colonels (minor league) managers
Louisville Colonels (minor league) players
St. Joseph Saints players
Des Moines Underwriters players
Des Moines Champs players
Des Moines Boosters players